Wong Hok-Sing (1913-1994) is a former Cantonese opera performer, actor, screenwriter and film director from Hong Kong in 1950s and 1960s. Wong is credited with over 75 films as an actor, over 200 films as a director, and over 70 films as a writer.

Early life 
In 1913, Wong was born in Guangdong, China.

Career 
Wong gained fame working for the Guangdong Professional Union for Cantonese Opera Performers, often appearing in troupes led by the likes of Sit Kok-sin and Ma Si-tsang. While touring the US he became interested in filmmaking, although had made his debut as a film actor in 1940 in General Di Qing. He began working for the Grandview Film Company, producing films such as White Powder and Neon Lights in 1947. Among his directed films are Seven Phoenixes (1961), Romance of the Phoenix Chamber (1962) and The Pitiless Sword (1964). Wong is known as one of the "Ten Brothers", a group of 10 Cantonese film directors in Hong Kong. Wong is credited with over 75 films as an actor, over 200 films as a director, and over 70 films as a writer.

Filmography

Films 
This is a partial list of films.
 1939 Breaking Through the Bronze Net
 1940 The Marrying General - Dik Ching
 1947 White Powder and Neon Lights - Screenwriter. Debut film Director. 
 1960 Lady Racketeer.
 1961 Seven Phoenixes (aka Golden Phoenix vs. the Dragon) - Director.
 1962 Romance of the Phoenix Chamber (aka The Princess in Distress) - Director.
 1967 A Gifted Scholar and a Beautiful Maid (aka Merry Maid) - Director.
 1967 Uproar in Jade Hall - Director.

References

External links
 
 Wong Hok-Sing at hkmdb.com

Film directors from Guangdong
Chinese male film actors
Hong Kong male film actors
Hong Kong male Cantonese opera actors
1913 births
1994 deaths
Singers from Guangdong
Hong Kong film directors
Male actors from Guangdong
20th-century Hong Kong male singers
20th-century Hong Kong male actors
20th-century Chinese male actors